The U.S. state of Minnesota  has 3,672 local government entities operating in its borders. These are either counties, towns, cities, school districts, or other special-purpose districts. In addition to the current levels of local government, villages and one borough historically also existed in the state, but they have all been abolished.

History
In 1952, Minnesota had the most local government entities of any state, numbering 9,025. However, by 2012, it had declined to eighth place, with 3,672 active entities.

Current entities

Counties

There are 87 counties in the state of Minnesota. Ramsey County obtained home rule by an act of the Minnesota State Legislature in 1992.

Towns

Eighty-four of the state's 87 counties are divided into towns, which number 1,784 in the state  and are equivalent to the civil townships in several other states; the terms "town" and "township" are used interchangeably in Minnesota. The towns' boundaries have been fixed since March 1, 1906, unless duly changed by their county.

Towns are corporate entities, having among other things the right to sue and own property. The governing body of the town is the town board; in addition, the electors of the town may vote on one of several issues in an annual town meeting.

Cities

All municipalities in the state are cities, of which there are 853 in the state . A city may or may not exist within the boundaries of a town. Cities are  divided into four classes based on population:
First class: More than 100,000 inhabitants
Second class: Between 20,000 and 100,000 inhabitants
Third class: Between 10,000 and 20,000 inhabitants
Fourth class: Not more than 10,000 inhabitants

Some cities, known as charter cities, have adopted home rule charters; all others are known as statutory cities.

School districts
There are 343 public school systems in the state . Each district is either a common school district, an independent school district, or a special school district. All three are headed by an elected school board and can levy taxes and issue bonds.

Special districts
There are 610 local governments in the state that have special uses . They include ambulance districts, the East Lake Clinical District, housing and redevelopment agencies, mental health collaboratives, the Metropolitan Mosquito Control District, and sanitary districts.

Former entities

Villages
Villages existed in the state prior to the enactment of the Uniform Code of Municipal Government in 1973. Villages were differentiated between "separated" and "unseparated" depending on whether they were considered a part of their town and therefore whether its residents had to pay town taxes and could vote in town elections. Villages incorporated prior to April 1949 were unseparated absent a referendum for separation, while villages incorporated afterwards were all separated. Former villages may continue to refer to themselves as "villages" in internal affairs and communications but are referred to as cities in legal proceedings.

Boroughs
Belle Plaine in Scott County was incorporated as a borough by a special act of the State Legislature in 1868 and remained so until it became a city in 1974. During that time it was the only borough in the state, and had the same roles and responsibilities as a village.

References

Works cited

Local government in Minnesota